James Charles Jacob Bagby Jr. (September 8, 1916 – September 2, 1988) was a starting pitcher in Major League Baseball who played for the Boston Red Sox, Cleveland Indians, and Pittsburgh Pirates. He batted and threw right-handed. His father, Jim Sr., was also a major league pitcher who played with Cincinnati, Cleveland and Pittsburgh between 1912 and 1923.

A native of Cleveland, Ohio, Bagby played with the Red Sox (twice), Indians and Pirates in a span of ten years. He posted a 97–96 record with 431 strikeouts and a 3.96 ERA in 1666 innings pitched, including 84 complete games and 13 shutouts.  He was the Indians pitcher in the July 17, 1941 game which ended Joe DiMaggio's famous 56-game hitting streak.

Bagby reached his career high of 17 wins in each of his All-Star seasons, in 1942 and 1943, and led the American League in starts both years with 35 and 33, respectively. After that, he served much of 1944 in the US Merchant Marine and never won more than eight games in a regular season.

As a hitter, Bagby was a better than average hitting pitcher in the majors, posting a .226 batting average (140-for-620) with 59 runs, 3 home runs and 56 RBI. He was used as a pinch hitter 18 times in his career.

Following his baseball career, Bagby became a professional golf player. In 1992, he was inducted into the Georgia Sports Hall of Fame.

Bagby died in Marietta, Georgia, six days before his 72nd birthday.  Bagby maintained a lifelong dislike of sports writers, as he was born with a cleft palate and was often made fun of by them for his appearance.

Facts
The Bagbys became the first father-and-son combination to pitch in the World Series when Jim Jr. appeared for the 1946 Red Sox. Jim Sr. pitched with the 1920 Indians.
Bagby is one of three pitchers in major league history to have three putouts in an inning. He did it in 1940, while playing for the Boston Red Sox. The others are Bob Heffner, also with the Red Sox in 1963, and Rick Reuschel with the Chicago Cubs in 1975.  Jim Battle also had three putouts in an inning, but he was not a pitcher.
Bagby, along with Al Smith, were the pitchers who ended Joe DiMaggio's 56-game hitting streak.

See also
 List of second-generation Major League Baseball players

References

External links

Jim Bagby Jr. - Baseballbiography.com
Georgia Sports Hall of Fame 
Jim Bagby Jr. at the Georgia Sports Hall of Fame
Jim Bagby at Retrosheet

1916 births
1988 deaths
American League All-Stars
American male golfers
Atlanta Crackers players
Baseball players from Cleveland
Boston Red Sox players
Charlotte Hornets (baseball) players
Cleveland Indians players
Golfers from Ohio
Hazleton Red Sox players
Indianapolis Indians players
Little Rock Travelers players
Major League Baseball pitchers
Pittsburgh Pirates players
Rocky Mount Red Sox players
Tampa Smokers players
United States Merchant Mariners of World War II